The Flat or The Flats may refer to any of the following:

Geography
The Flat (Houtman Abrolhos), a reef in Australia's Houtman Abrolhos island group
"The Flat", a nickname for South Dunedin, New Zealand
The Flat, Gloucestershire, in southwest England
The Flats, Cleveland, Ohio, USA
The Flats, Holyoke, Massachusetts
The Flats (Woodbridge), Connecticut, USA

Entertainment
The Flat (1921 film), a British silent film
The Flat (1968 film) (Byt), a Czech film
The Flat (2011 film), an Israeli film
The Flats (film), 2002 drama film

See also
Flat (disambiguation)